Lima is the name of multiple locations in the U.S. state of Wisconsin:
Lima, Grant County, Wisconsin, a town
Lima, Pepin County, Wisconsin, a town
Lima, Rock County, Wisconsin, a town
Lima, Sheboygan County, Wisconsin, a town
Lima (community), Wisconsin, an unincorporated community in Pepin County
Lima Center, Wisconsin, an unincorporated community in Rock County
West Lima, Wisconsin, an unincorporated community in Richland County
Harrison (town), Calumet County, Wisconsin, was originally known as Lima